Jashn-e-Bahara is an Urdu song from Jodhaa Akbar which was sung by Javed Ali, composed by A. R. Rahman and written by Javed Akhtar.

Synopsis 
Jashn-E-Bahara portrays that everything appears wonderful when the person is in love and then, someone enters in the life of the person and changes everything.

Awards 

 Mirchi Music Award for Song of The Year at 1st Mirchi Music Awards
 Mirchi Music Award for Lyricist of The Year to Javed Akhtar at 1st Mirchi Music Awards
 Mirchi Music Award for Male Vocalist of The Year to Javed Ali at 1st Mirchi Music Awards
 Best Song Mixing & Engineering to H. Sridhar at 1st Mirchi Music Awards
 Filmfare Award for Best Lyricist to Javed Akhtar at 54th Filmfare Awards
 IIFA Award for Best Lyricist to Javed Akhtar at 10th IIFA Awards
 IIFA Award for Best Male Playback Singer to Javed Ali at 10th IIFA Awards

References 

Urdu-language songs